The politics of Egypt takes place within the framework of a republican semi-presidential system of government. The current political system was established following the 2013 Egyptian military coup d'état, and the takeover of President Abdel Fattah el-Sisi. In the current system, the President is elected for a six-year term. He can appoint up to 5 percent of the parliament. Furthermore, the President has the power to dissolve Parliament through Article 137.
The Parliament of Egypt is the oldest legislative chamber in Africa and the Middle East. The unicameral Parliament has the ability to impeach the President through Article 161. With 2020 elections to the new Senate, the chamber became bicameral.

Presidency

The position was created after the Egyptian Revolution of 1952; Mohammed Naguib was the first to hold the position. Before 2005, the Parliament chose a candidate for the presidency and the people voted, in a referendum, whether or not they approved the proposed candidate for president. After the Egyptian Revolution of 2011, a new presidential election was held 2012, it was the first free and fair elections in Egypt's political history. After a wave of public discontent with autocratic excesses of the Muslim Brotherhood government of President Mohamed Morsi; the beginning of July 2013 marked the onset of the 2013 Egyptian coup d'état, following the decision of General Abdel Fattah el-Sisi, to remove Morsi from office and suspend the constitution of 2012. El-Sisi was then elected head of state in the 2014 presidential election. On 8 June 2014, Abdel Fatah el-Sisi was officially sworn in as Egypt's new president.

The Article 133 of Egypt's constitution of 2012 determines a 4-year period of presidential mandate, to which the candidate can only be re-elected once. According to the document, to be eligible the candidate “must be Egyptian born to Egyptian parents, must have carried no other citizenship, must have civil and political right, cannot be married to a non-Egyptian,” and not be younger than 40 Gregorian years.

The Article 146 declares the president of being the Supreme Commander of the Armed Forces. However, to declare war or to send armed forces outside state territory the president must consult the National Defense Council likewise have the approval's majority of the MPs.

In April 2019, Egypt's parliament extended presidential terms from four to six years.

A constitutional referendum was held in Egypt from 20 to 22 April 2019, with overseas voting taking place between 19 and 21 April. The proposed changes allowed President Abdel Fattah el-Sisi to remain in power until 2030; under the previous version of the constitution, he would have been barred from contesting the next elections, set to take place in 2022. The changes were approved by 88.83% of voters who voted, with a 44% turnout.

Legislative branch

Parliament meets for one eight-month session each year; under special circumstances the President of the Republic can call an additional session. Even though the powers of the Parliament have increased since the 1980 Amendments of the Constitution, the Parliament continues to lack the powers to balance the extensive powers of the President.

The House of Representatives (Magles en Nowwáb)

The House of Representatives is the principal legislative body. It consists of a maximum 596 representatives with 448 are directly elected through FPTP and another 120 elected through proportional representation in 4 nationwide districts while the President can appoint up to 28.  The House sits for a five-year term but can be dissolved earlier by the President.

The Constitution reserves fifty per cent of the House may force the resignation of the executive cabinet by voting a motion of censure. For this reason, the Prime Minister and his cabinet are necessarily from the dominant party or coalition in the assembly. In the case of a president and house from opposing parties, this leads to the situation known as cohabitation.

The recent elections were held in 2015 and most recently in 2020.

The Consultative Council (Maglis El-Shura)
The Shura Council was the 264-member upper house of Parliament created in 1980. In the Shura Council, 176 members were directly elected and 88 members were appointed by the President of the Republic for six-year terms. One half of the Shura Council was renewed every three years.

The Shura Council's legislative powers were limited. On most matters of legislation, the People's Assembly retained the last word in the event of a disagreement between the two houses.

The Shura Council was abolished in the 2014 constitution.

Parliamentary Elections
Political parties in Egypt are numerous and exceeds 100 parties. The formation of political parties based on religion, race or gender is prohibited by the Constitution. Before the revolution in 2011, power was concentrated in the hands of the President of the Republic and the National Democratic Party which retained a super-majority in the People's Assembly.

Many new political parties that mostly were fragile formed in anticipation of running candidates in the 2011–12 Egyptian parliamentary election that was considered the first free one since the 1952 revolution. However the elected Parliament was dissolved by the constitutional court and new elections were held in 2015.

Below the national level, authority is exercised by and through governors and mayors appointed by the central government and by popularly elected local councils.

Political parties and elections

According to the Egyptian Constitution, political parties are allowed to exist. Religious political parties are not allowed as it would not respect the principle of non-interference of religion in politics and that religion has to remain in the private sphere to respect all beliefs. Also forbidden are political parties supporting militia formations or having an agenda that is contradictory to the constitution and its principles, or threatening the country's stability such as national unity between Muslim Egyptians and Christian Egyptians.

As of 2015, there are more than 100 registered political parties in Egypt. The largest were the Free Egyptians Party, New Wafd Party, Conference Party, and the Egyptian Social Democratic Party.

In December 2020, final results of the parliamentary election confirmed a clear majority of the seats for Egypt’s Mostaqbal Watn (Nation’s Future) Party, which strongly supports president El-Sisi. The party even increased its majority, partly because of new electoral rules.

Civil society

Egyptians had lived under emergency law from 1967 until 31 May 2012 (with one 18-month break starting in 1980). Emergency laws have been extended every three years since 1981. These laws sharply circumscribed any non-governmental political activity: street demonstrations, non-approved political organizations, and unregistered financial donations were formally banned. However, since 2000, these restrictions have been violated in practice. In 2003, the agenda shifted heavily towards local democratic reforms, opposition to the succession of Gamal Mubarak as president, and rejection of violence by state security forces. Groups involved in the latest wave include PCSPI, the Egyptian Movement for Change (Kefaya), and the Association for Egyptian Mothers.

Substantial peasant activism exists on a variety of issues, especially related to land rights and land reform. A major turning point was the 1997 repeal of Nasser-era land reform policies under pressure for structural adjustment. A pole for this activity is the Land Center for Human Rights.

The Egyptian Revolution of 2011, inspired by the recent revolution in Tunisia, forced the resignation of President Mubarak and the Military Junta that succeeded him abrogated the Constitution and promised free and fair elections under a new one. On August 15, 2015, President al-Sisi enacted a new Counter-Terrorism Law, which Human Rights Watch claims "mimics" language "already contained in Egypt’s decades-old Emergency Law". In Article 2, one of many references include terrorism as "any use of intimidation for the purpose of disturbing public order; harms national unity, social peace, or national security". Following to Section 2,  the President "may issue a decree to take appropriate measures to maintain security and public order", addressed in Article 53. This includes "the power to order six-month curfews or evacuations in defined areas, subject to a majority vote in parliament within seven days, or cabinet approval if parliament is not in session."

Political pressure
Before the revolution, Mubarak tolerated limited political activity by the Brotherhood for his first two terms,  then moved more aggressively to block its influence. Trade unions and professional associations are officially sanctioned. In 2014, in Upper Egypt, several newspapers reported that the region of Upper Egypt wants to secede from Egypt to try to improve living standards.

Foreign relations

The permanent headquarters for the League of Arab States (The Arab League) is located in Cairo. The Secretary-General of the League has traditionally been an Egyptian. Former Egyptian Foreign Minister Ahmed Abu El Ghet is the present Secretary-General of the Arab League. The Arab League moved out of Egypt to Tunis in 1978 as a protest at the peace treaty with Israel but returned in 1989.

Egypt was the first Arab state to establish diplomatic relations with the state of Israel, after the signing of the Egypt–Israel peace treaty at the Camp David Accords. Egypt has a major influence amongst other Arab states, and has historically played an important role as a mediator in resolving disputes between various Arab nations, and in the Israeli–Palestinian dispute. Most Arab nations still give credence to Egypt playing that role, though its effects are often limited.

Former Egyptian Deputy Prime Minister Boutros Boutros-Ghali served as Secretary General of the United Nations from 1991 to 1996.

A territorial dispute with Sudan over an area known as the Hala'ib Triangle has meant that diplomatic relations between the two remain strained.

References

Bibliography
 Hatem Elliesie: The Rule of Law in Egypt. In: Matthias Koetter / Gunnar Folke Schuppert (Eds.), Understanding of the Rule of Law in various Legal Orders of the World: Working Paper Series Nr. 5 of SFB 700: Governance in Limited Areas of Statehood, Berlin 2010.

Further reading

 Nathan J. Brown, Shimaa Hatab, and Amr Adly. 2021. Lumbering State, Restless Society: Egypt in the Modern Era. Columbia University Press

External links

 Comparison Between Ancient And Modern Egyptian Governments at Aldokkan
 Egypt at Global Integrity Report
 Egypt: A Nation in Waiting (Al Jazeera documentary focusing on past trends in Egypt's political history and protests.)

General government sites
 Official Egyptian Government Portal
 Egyptian Investment Portal official government site
 Egypt State Information Service official government site
 The Egyptian Presidency
 The People Assembly of Egypt
 Egyptian Shoura Council

 
Government of Egypt